The rufous-throated partridge (Arborophila rufogularis) is a species of bird in the family Phasianidae. It is found in montane forests in India and Southeast Asia. The International Union for Conservation of Nature (IUCN) has assessed it as a least-concern species.

Description
The male weighs  and the female weighs . The male has a grey forehead. The olive-brown crown and nape have black mottles. There are a whitish supercilium and moustachial curves. The throat and neck-sides are orange-rufous, with black speckles. The breast and flanks are blue-grey. The upper belly is blue-grey and the central belly is whitish. The vent is buffy-brown. The mantle, back and rump are olive-brown. The scapulars and wing coverts have chestnut, black and greyish bands. The beak is dusky-brown or blackish, and the legs are pinkish or crimson. The female is similar to the male. The juvenile bird is duller below, and its crown and flanks have brown and black vermiculations. The subspecies have different patterns on their throats.

Distribution and habitat
The rufous-throated partridge is found in Bangladesh, Bhutan, China, India, Laos, Myanmar, Nepal, Thailand, and Vietnam. Oak forests containing laurels and rhododendrons are preferred.

Behaviour
This partridge feeds in groups of five to ten birds. It eats seeds, plant shoots, berries, insects and snails. Surprised birds run or fly, sometimes flying to branches like some thrushes. Birds in a covey roost and huddle together in trees, similar to babblers. Breeding has been recorded from April to July in India and from February to May in China. The male builds a scrape in bamboo, forest undergrowth or along water. The nest is lined or padded with grass. Three to five white eggs are laid. The rufous-throated partridge gives a rising series of hu-hu whistles. In a duet, the partner's call is kew-kew-kew.

Taxonomy
This species was described by Blyth in 1849. 

The rufous-throated partridge has 6 recognized subspecies:

 A. r. annamensis (Robinson & Kloss, 1919) - in south-central Vietnam.
 A. r. euroa (Bangs & Phillips J.C., 1914) - in southeastern Yunnan and northern Laos
 A. r. guttata (Delacour & Jabouille, 1928) - in central Vietnam and central Laos
 A. r. intermedia (Blyth, 1849) - ranging from northeastern India to northern Myanmar

 A. r. rufogularis (Blyth,1849) - found in northeastern India, Nepal, Bhutan and southeastern Tibet

 A. r. tickelli (Hume,1880) - in eastern Myanmar, Thailand and southwestern Laos

Status
The IUCN estimates that the species's population is declining because of habitat destruction and unsustainable hunting, but the decline is not rapid, and the range is large, so the IUCN has assessed it as a least-concern species.

References

rufous-throated partridge
Birds of North India
Birds of Nepal
Birds of Eastern Himalaya
Birds of Southeast Asia
Birds of Laos
Birds of Yunnan
rufous-throated partridge
rufous-throated partridge
Taxonomy articles created by Polbot